The following is a timeline of the history of the city of Freetown, Sierra Leone.

Prior to 19th century
 1787
 9 May: Settlers arrive from Portsmouth, England.
 Granville Town, Province of Freedom established by the London-based Committee for the Relief of the Black Poor.
 1789 - Granville Town burned down.
 1792 - Freetown established by black American ex-slaves (called the Nova Scotian Settlers) under the auspices of the Sierra Leone Company.
 1794 - September: Settler Town attacked by French.
 1800
 September: Rebellion of Nova Scotian Settlers.
 Jamaican Maroon settlers arrive.

19th century

 1805 - Martello Tower built.
 1808
 Freetown settlement becomes a British crown colony.
 "Slavers court" established.
 1811 - Population: 1,900.
 1812 - Wilberforce suburb founded for Liberated Africans."
 1816 - Krootown established.
 1822
 Rawdon Street Methodist Church built.
 Population: 4,785.
 1827 - Fourah Bay College established.
 1828 - St. George's Cathedral, Freetown built.
 1830s - Foulah Town Mosque built.
 1845
 Church Mission Society Grammar School founded.
 John Ezzidio becomes mayor.
 1846 - Cline Town established.
 1847 - Female Institution (school) founded.
 1853 - Inhabitants become "British subjects."
 1865 - Samuel Lewis becomes mayor.
 1866 - St. Edward's Primary School founded.
 1867 - Government Wharf built.
 1872 - Pope Hennessy Day festival begins.
 1873 - Independent newspaper begins publication.
 1874 - Wesleyan High School for Boys opens.
 1875 - West African Reporter newspaper begins publication.
 1884
 Sierra Leone Weekly News begins publication.
 Leopold Educational Institute opens.
 Fire.
 1891 - Population: 30,033.
 1893 - Town attains city status; Freetown City Council established.
 1895 - Governor's residence built.
 1898 - Bank of British West Africa branch and ice factory established.
 1899 - Songo Town-Freetown railway begins operating.

20th century

 1901 - Population: 34,463.
 1904
 John Henry Malamah Thomas becomes mayor.
 Albert Academy founded.
 1905
 Madrasa Islamia active.
 Lisk-Carew photo studio in business.
 1918 - Population: 34,000 (approximate).
 1919 - July: Strike and anti-Syrian riot.
 1922 - St. Edward's Secondary School founded.
 1923 - Girls' Industrial and Technical Training School established.
 1925 - Prince of Wales School founded.
 1926
 January: Railway strike.
 December: City Council dissolved; Municipal Board established.
 1928 - East End Lions Football Club formed.
 1930 - Women granted right to vote.
 1932
 Muslim Congress created.
 Sierra Leone Daily Mail newspaper begins publication.
 1938
 West African Youth League and League of Coloured Peoples branch headquartered in Freetown.
 Freetown Secondary School for Girls established.
 1948
 Eustace Henry Taylor Cummings becomes mayor.
 Population: 64,576.
 1953 - Deep Water Quay construction begins.
 1961 - City becomes capital of independent Sierra Leone.
 1962 - Siaka Stevens becomes mayor.
 1963 - Population: 127,917.
 1964 - Bank of Sierra Leone headquartered in city.
 1965 - Sierra Leone Port Authority established.
 1966 - Constance Cummings-John becomes mayor.
 1971 - City becomes capital of the Republic of Sierra Leone.
 1974 - Population: 214,443.
 1977 - Ode-lay Society (social club) formed.
 1980 - Siaka Stevens Stadium opens.
 1983 - For Di People newspaper begins publication.
 1985 - Population: 469,776.

1990s

 1990 - Population: 529,000 (urban agglomeration).
 1995 - Population: 603,000 (urban agglomeration).
 1996 - Freetown/New Haven Sister Cities established.
 1997
 25 March: "Rebels move into Freetown;" prisoners freed from the Pademba Road prison.
 30 May: Foreigners evacuated.
 2 June: AFRC conflict.
 1998
 February: "Ecomog storms Freetown and drives rebels out."
 Kabbah returns to Freetown.
 1999
 January: City besieged by Armed Forces Revolutionary Council/Revolutionary United Front.
 November: United Nations troops arrive.
 2000
 2 May: City Hotel burns down.
 8 May: Peace demonstration.
 Center for Media, Technology and Education established.
 Population: 688,000 (urban agglomeration).

21st century

 2002
 Sierra Leone Civil War ends.
 Special Court for Sierra Leone and Kallon Football Club established.
 2003 - 14 April: Truth and Reconciliation Commission (Sierra Leone) convenes.
 2004
 Winstanley Bankole Johnson becomes mayor.
 Population: 772,873.
 2005 - Njala University College established.
 2010 - Population: 945,423.
 2012
 Cholera epidemic.
 Sam Franklyn Gibson becomes mayor.
 2015 - Population: 1,055,964.

See also
 Freetown history
 Schools in Freetown
 List of mayors of Freetown
 History of Sierra Leone

References

Bibliography

Published in 19th century
 
 
 

Published in 20th century
 
 H. R. Jarrett. The Port and Town of Freetown, Geography, Vol. 40, 1955, pp. 108–118.
 
 
 Michael Banton. West African City: A Study of Tribal Life in Freetown. London: Oxford University, 1957.
 
 
 
 
 
 
 
 
 
 
 M.B. Gleave. "Port activities and the spatial structure of cities: the case of Freetown, Sierra Leone." Journal of Transport Geography 5.4 (1997): 257–275.
 
 
 

Published in 21st century
  + website
 
 
 
 
 
 
 
 
 Kenneth Lynch et al. "Meeting the urban challenge? Urban agriculture and food security in post-conflict Freetown, Sierra Leone." Applied Geography (2012).
 Roy Maconachie, Tony Binns, and Paul Tengbe. "Urban farming associations, youth and food security in post-war Freetown, Sierra Leone." Cities 29.3 (2012): 192–200.

External links

  (Bibliography of open access  articles)
  (Images, etc.)
  (Images, etc.)
  (Bibliography)
  (Bibliography)
  (Bibliography)
 

Freetown
Freetown
Freetown
Freetown
Freetown